Vaksdal Station is a railway station located in the village of Vaksdal in the municipality of Vaksdal, Vestland county, Norway.  The station is located along the Bergen Line. The station is served by twelve daily departures per direction by the Bergen Commuter Rail operated by Vy Tog, as well by the night train to Oslo Central Station. The station opened in 1883 as part of the Voss Line.

The restaurant in the station was taken over by Norsk Spisevognselskap on 1 January 1924, and it was closed on 15 December 1935.

References

External links
 Vaksdal at the Norwegian National Rail Administration

Railway stations in Vaksdal
Railway stations on Bergensbanen
Railway stations opened in 1883
1883 establishments in Norway
Vaksdal